Landulf III may refer to:

 Landulf III of Capua (died 943)
 Landulf III of Benevento (died 968 or 969)